Rios may refer to:

People
Ríos and Rios, Spanish, Portuguese, and Galician surnames

Places
 Rios, Texas, an unincorporated community in Duval County, Texas, U.S.
 Riós, a municipality in of Ourense province, Galicia, Spain

See also
 
 
 
 
 Rio (disambiguation), (Rios is the singular form of Ríos "rivers")
 Rivière (disambiguation)
 Rive (disambiguation)
 Rivers (disambiguation)
 River (disambiguation)
 Los Rios (disambiguation)